A gaucho (gaúcho in Portuguese) is a South American cattle herder.

Gaucho or The Gaucho may also refer to:

Arts and entertainment
 The Gaucho, a 1927 adventure film starring Douglas Fairbanks
 Guacho (film), a 1954 Argentine film
 Il Gaucho, a 1964 Italian comedy film
Gaucho, a play by Doug Lucie
 Gaucho, a character in the 1952 film The Bad and the Beautiful, played by Gilbert Roland
 The Gaucho, an Argentine member of the Batmen of All Nations, a DC Comics superhero group

Music
 Gaucho (album), a 1980 album by Steely Dan, or the title song
 "Gaúcho" (song), a Brazilian tango
 O gaúcho, an 1870 novel by the Brazilian writer José de Alencar

Vehicles
 GMC Gaucho, a mid 1970s full-sized van model produced by General Motors
 VLEGA Gaucho, a 4x4 vehicle developed for the armies of Argentina and Brazil

Sports
 Sport Club Gaúcho, a Brazilian football club
 The UC Santa Barbara Gauchos, the sports teams of the University of California, Santa Barbara
 San Diego Gauchos, an American soccer team from 2002 to 2006

People
Gaúcho is a common nickname for a person born in the Brazilian state of Rio Grande do Sul:
 Gaúcho (footballer, born 1964) (1964–2016), Brazilian football player and coach, Luís Carlos Tóffoli
 Gaúcho (footballer, born 1972), Eric Freire Gomes, Brazilian football striker
 Cléber Gaúcho (born 1974), Brazilian football player
 Gaúcho (footballer, born 1980), full name Márcio Rodrigo Trombetta, Brazilian football centre-back
 Diego Gaúcho (born 1981), Brazilian football player
 Eric Freire Gomes (born 1972), Brazilian football player from Pernambuco
 Éder Gaúcho (born 1977), Brazilian retired football player
 Edson Gaúcho (born 1955), Brazilian retired football player
 Fernando Gaúcho (born 1980), Brazilian football player
 Lucas Gaúcho (born 1991), Brazilian football player
 Luís Fernando Gaúcho (born 1955), Brazilian retired football player
 Rafael Gaúcho (born 1982), Brazilian football player
 Renato Gaúcho (born 1962), Brazilian football player and manager
 Roger Gaúcho (born 1986), Brazilian football player
 Rogério Gaúcho (born 1979), Brazilian football player from Paraná
 Ronaldinho (born 1980), Brazilian football player
 Sandro Gaúcho (born 1974), Brazilian retired football player
 Thiago Corrêa (born 1982), Brazilian football player
 Tiago Gaúcho (born 1984), Brazilian football player
 Antonio Rivero ("El Gaucho"), a gaucho who led eight men in murdering five prominent people in the Falkland Islands in 1833

Other uses
 El Gaucho (disambiguation)
 Gaucho (currency), a proposed currency that was intended to be used by Argentina and Brazil
 Gaucho, a trade name for the insecticide imidacloprid
 A type of women's clothing, a combination of a romper suit and culottes.
 Gaucho is a Tunisian biscuit produced by Saida

Lists of people by nickname